A special election was held in  on May 5, 1794, to fill a vacancy left by the resignation of John Francis Mercer (A) on April 13, 1794

Election results

Duvall was seated November 11, 1794

See also
List of special elections to the United States House of Representatives

References

Maryland 1794 02
Maryland 1794 02
1794 02
Maryland 02
United States House of Representatives
United States House of Representatives 1794 02